Eddie "Ek" Calder was an American college basketball standout at St. Lawrence University in the 1910s. He was a Helms Athletic Foundation All-American in 1913 and was also named their national player of the year that season. He played the forward position and was St. Lawrence's second Helms All-American in two seasons (Thomas Canfield earned the honor in 1912).

References

Year of birth missing
Year of death missing
All-American college men's basketball players
American men's basketball players
Forwards (basketball)
St. Lawrence Saints men's basketball players